The 1994 Copa Libertadores was the 35th edition of the Copa Libertadores, CONMEBOL's premier annual international competition. Vélez Sársfield won the tournament for their first title against São Paulo in a penalty shootout with a score of 5–3. Vélez's goalkeeper José Chilavert scored one of the penalty kicks and saved another one. The top scorer of the tournament was Stalin Rivas of Minervén S.C., with 7 goals.

First Phase 

Legend: Pts: Points; P: Played games; W: Won games; D: Drawn games; L: Lost games; F: Goals in favor; A: Goals against; D: Difference.

Group 1

Group 2

Group 3

Group 4

Group 5

Final Phase

Finals

Champion

External links 
 Copa Libertadores de América 1994 results at RSSSF

1
Copa Libertadores seasons